Edward Charles Manyama (born 2 April 1994) is a Tanzanian football defender who plays for Namungo.

References

1994 births
Living people
Tanzanian footballers
Tanzania international footballers
Young Africans S.C. players
Ruvu Shooting F.C. players
Namungo F.C. players
People from Tabora Region
Association football defenders
Tanzanian Premier League players
Tanzania A' international footballers
2020 African Nations Championship players